Jeffrey Joseph Marquez (born August 10, 1984) is an American former professional baseball pitcher. He played in Major League Baseball (MLB) for the Chicago White Sox and New York Yankees.

Career

New York Yankees
Marquez attended Sacramento City College before being chosen by the New York Yankees in the supplemental round as the 41st overall pick of 2004 MLB draft. Marquez was a compensation pick for losing David Wells to the San Diego Padres.

In , Marquez played for the Single-A Charleston RiverDogs. Making a team leading 27 starts, he went 9-13 with an ERA of 3.42. Marquez was second on the team to Chase Wright in wins (9), innings pitched, and strikeouts (107).

In , Marquez played for the Double-A Trenton Thunder and was an Eastern League midseason All-Star for the team that year. Marquez went 15-9 with a 3.65 ERA for the Thunder. He led the league with 15 wins, was tied with 27 starts, was tied for second in innings pitched, tied for third in complete games (2), and was tenth in ERA (3.65).

On November 20, 2007, the New York Yankees purchased Marquez's contract, protecting him from the Rule 5 draft.

Chicago White Sox
On November 13, 2008, Marquez, along with minor league pitcher Jhonny Núñez, and utility man Wilson Betemit were traded to the Chicago White Sox for first baseman/outfielder Nick Swisher and minor league pitcher Kanekoa Texeira.

Marquez made his MLB debut on July 9, 2010, pitching the 9th inning vs. Kansas City allowing 2 runs in an 8-2 White Sox win. The White Sox recalled him on May 30, 2011. He was designated for assignment on June 5.

Return to Yankees
Marquez was claimed off waivers by the New York Yankees on June 8 and added to the MLB roster when Joba Chamberlain was placed on the DL. On August 27, the Yankees outrighted Marquez to the Triple-A Scranton/Wilkes-Barre Yankees. He was granted free agency in November 2011.

Seattle Mariners
On November 10, 2011, the Seattle Mariners signed Marquez to a minor league contract. He was released on July 24, 2012.

Colorado Rockies
He was signed by Colorado Rockies on Aug 11th, 2012, and assigned to Triple A Colorado Springs Sky Sox.

Cincinnati Reds
On January 2, 2013, he signed a minor league contract with the Cincinnati Reds but was released soon after.

Comeback attempt
After not playing for two years, he returned to active duty with the Sioux City Explorers of the independent American Association.

Pericos de Puebla
On March 11, 2016, Marquez signed with the Pericos de Puebla of the Mexican Baseball League. He was released on February 21, 2017.

References

External links

1984 births
Living people
American expatriate baseball players in Mexico
Baseball players at the 2011 Pan American Games
Baseball players from California
Charleston RiverDogs players
Charlotte Knights players
Chicago White Sox players
Colorado Springs Sky Sox players
Gulf Coast Yankees players
Major League Baseball pitchers
Mexican League baseball pitchers
New York Yankees players
Pan American Games medalists in baseball
Pan American Games silver medalists for the United States
Pericos de Puebla players
People from Vacaville, California
Peoria Javelinas players
Peoria Saguaros players
Sacramento City Panthers baseball players
Scranton/Wilkes-Barre Yankees players
Sioux City Explorers players
Staten Island Yankees players
Tacoma Rainiers players
Tampa Yankees players
Trenton Thunder players
United States national baseball team players
West Oahu Canefires players
Medalists at the 2011 Pan American Games